Yauri (or Yawuri) is an emirate in Nigeria's Kebbi State, occupying the Yauri Local Government Area. Today, Yauri is one of the smallest historical emirates in Northern Nigeria.

History

The area was first settled by an eastern group around early 1000-1200 AD, predominantly by a Benue–Congo linguistic group, the Kamberis. Then for a brief period of time, Yauri was invaded by Mali and it incorporated a few Songhai invaders into its social structure. The increasing agricultural surplus exhibited by the early settlers and the availability of fertile land near a river brought in a diverse and malleable group of migrants seeking fertile land to farm, and the groups were initially dominated by the Gungawas. This became the second wave of migration into Yauri. Around the seventeenth century, this group waged a war over the Kamberis and became the dominant political group in the area under the first Emir of Yauri, Sarkin Yauri Garba.

However, by the eighteenth century, slave raiding had clipped the political and economic structures of the area. The need for a much more powerful political entity became necessary in order to strengthen the emirate against slave raiders from without. A movement by the ruling and malleable Gungawas to assimilate with the dominant Hausas in the region led to a gradual inter-ethnic political relationship with Hausas. However, in early nineteenth century, the success of the Funlani jihad made Yauri a tributary state of Gwandu.

Independent rulers

Following were the independent rulers (Sarkin Yawuri) in the 19th century.

Colonial and post colonial rulers

P.G. Harris was a colonial administrator in Nigeria and Cameroon. He was born in Liverpool and studied at St Bees School, Cumberland. In 1916, he was made lieutenant of the Infantry, Nigeria regiments. In 1919, he joined the Nigerian administrative service. In 1935, he was made the senior resident Sokoto, a position which included Yauri. 

Sarkin Abdullahi was a native ruler of Yauri after the disastrous rule of Aliyu, a fulani ruler. He was quite educated and was a teacher before his coronation as Sarkin. He was known for his meticulous dedication to education, health and generally most services under his emirate. He was born in 1910, and was educated at the Provincial School Kano.

Following were the independent rulers (Sarkin Yawuri) in the colonial and post-colonial period.

References

	

Kebbi State
Nigerian traditional states
Emirates